is a former Japanese football player. She played for Japan national team.

Club career
Yamaguchi was born in Shizuoka Prefecture on July 25, 1966. She played for Shimizudaihachi SC, Suzuyo Shimizu FC Lovely Ladies and Tasaki Perule FC from 1981 to 2000. She was selected Best Eleven 4 times (1989, 1991, 1992 and 1993) in L.League.

National team career
On September 6, 1981, when Yamaguchi was 15 years old, she debuted for Japan national team against England. She was a member of Japan for 1991 World Cup. She also played at 1986, 1991, 1993 AFC Championship and 1990 Asian Games. She played 29 games and scored 1 goal for Japan until 1993.

National team statistics

References

External links
 

1966 births
Living people
Association football people from Shizuoka Prefecture
Japanese women's footballers
Japan women's international footballers
Nadeshiko League players
Shimizudaihachi Pleiades players
Suzuyo Shimizu FC Lovely Ladies players
Tasaki Perule FC players
Footballers at the 1990 Asian Games
1991 FIFA Women's World Cup players
Women's association football defenders
Asian Games silver medalists for Japan
Asian Games medalists in football
Medalists at the 1990 Asian Games